The Archdeacon of Richmond and Craven is an archdiaconal post in the Church of England. It was created in about 1088 within the See of York and was moved in 1541 to the See of Chester, in 1836 to the  See of Ripon and after 2014 to the See of Leeds, in which jurisdiction it remains today. It is divided into seven rural deaneries: Ewecross, Harrogate, Richmond, Ripon, Skipton, and Wensley, all in Yorkshire and Bowland in Lancashire.

History

The Archdeaconry of Richmond was created in about 1088 and was endowed by Thomas, Archbishop of York. Originally it comprised the western parts of Yorkshire and Lancashire, as well as the greater portion of the counties of Cumberland and Westmorland and was the wealthiest and most extensive archdeaconry in England. Its valuable impropriations included Easingwold, Bolton, Clapham and Thornton Steward. However in 1127 King Henry I removed Allerdale and Cumberland from the Archdeaconry in order to form the new See of Carlisle. By way of compensation for this loss, Thurstan, Archbishop of York, conferred upon the Archdeacon all the privileges and prerogatives of a bishop, with the exception that he could not ordain, consecrate, or confirm. The Archdeacon had his own consistory court at Richmond in Yorkshire, where wills were proved, licences and faculties granted, and all matters of ecclesiastical cognizance dealt with. He exercised the sole supervision of clergy within his jurisdiction, including institution to, and removal from, benefices.

In 1541 King Henry VIII established the See of Chester in Lancashire, into which the office of Archdeacon of Richmond was incorporated, although its judicial powers were transferred to the See of York. Although its revenues suffered serious diminution and its position had become that of a commissary elected by the Bishop of Chester, the Archdeacon continued to exercise the same authority, judicial and otherwise, as his predecessors and retained his stall within the choir of York Minster. However by 1805 the position was described as a mere "sinecure".

In 1836 the Archdeaconry of Richmond was transferred to the jurisdiction of the newly formed See of Ripon in Yorkshire, and in January 1838 the consistory court of Richmond was abolished, along with all its other peculiars.
On the creation of the See of Leeds in 2014, the Archdeaconry received the territory of the Archdeaconry of Craven and was renamed the "Archdeaconry of Richmond and Craven". It now forms the "Ripon episcopal area".

List of archdeacons
Some archdeacons without territorial titles are recorded from around the time of Thomas of Bayeux; see Archdeacon of York.

High Medieval
bef. 1128–1157 (dep.): Osbert de Bayeux
–aft. 1164: Bartholomew
bef. 1184–1189 (res.): Godfrey de Luci (became Bishop of Winchester)
–aft. 1196: William de Chemillé (also Bishop-elect of Avranches; became Bishop of Angers)
–1197 (res.): Eustace, Dean of Salisbury and Archdeacon of the East Riding
bef. 1198–bef. 1199 (ej.): Honorius of Kent
1198–1202 (deprived): Roger de Sancto Edmundo
1199–aft. 1199 (exc.): Honorius (again)
1202–1208 (deprived): Honorius (third term)
: Morgan (royal bastard, sometime provost of Beverley and Bishop-elect of Durham)
bef. 1213–1217 (res.): Richard Marsh
bef. 1218–aft. 1238: William Langton (of Rotherfield)
bef. 1239–aft. 1239: Walter de Woburn
bef. 1240–bef. 1241: Robert Haget
bef. 1241–aft. 1252: John le Romeyn the elder
bef. 1253–aft. 1260: William
bef. 1262–aft. 1269: Simon of Evesham
bef. 1271–aft. 1271: Richard le Brun
5 December 1272–aft. 1273: Thomas Passelew
bef. 1276–aft. 1278: Geoffrey de Sancto Marco
28 April 1279 – 12 May 1290 (res.): Henry of Newark
1290–aft. 1301: Gerard de Vuippens

Late Medieval
bef. 1301–16 May 1317 (d.): Francesco Cardinal Caetani (cardinal-deacon of Santa Maria in Cosmedin)
25 April 1309 – 1310 (dep.): John Sandale (unsuccessfully opposed Caetani)
1317–1322 (res.): Roger Northburgh (became Bishop of Coventry and Lichfield)
2 November 1322 – 1328 (res.): Hélie de Talleyrand-Périgord, Bishop of Limoges
1328–January 1346 (d.): Robert Wodehouse
7 January–May 1346 (res.): John Gynwell
June 1346–20 November 1348 (d.): Jean-Raymond Cardinal de Comminges, Cardinal-Bishop of Porto
1349–bef. 1359 (d.): Henry de Walton
13 December 1359–bef. 1383 (d.): Humphrey de Cherleton
1383–11 January 1385 (exch.): John Bacon
11 January 1385 – 1388 (res.): John Waltham (became Bishop of Salisbury)
1388–May 1400 (d.): Thomas Dalby (er)
19 May 1400 – 4 March 1401 (dep.): Stephen Scrope
4 March 1401 – 18 March 1402 (exch.): Nicholas Bubwith
18 March 1402–bef. 1418 (d.): Stephen Scrope (again)
6 September 1418–bef. 1442 (res.): Henry Bowet
8 November 1442 – 1450 (res.): Thomas Kempe (became Bishop of London)
8 February 1450 – 1454 (res.): William Grey
17 August 1454 – 1457 (res.): Lawrence Booth
17 October 1457 – 1459 (res.): John Arundel
21 May 1459 – 1465 (res.): John Booth
5 July 1465 – 1484 (res.): John Sherwood
2 January 1485 – 1485 (d.): Edward de la Pole
28 September 1485 – 1493 (res.): John Blyth

5 March 1494 – 1500 (res.): Christopher Urswick, Dean of York until 1494, Dean of Windsor from 1496 (also Archdeacon of Wilts, and Archdeacon of Norfolk (from 1500))
1500–1506 (res.): James Stanley
24 September 1506–bef. 1526 (d.): Thomas Dalby (yr)
1526–bef. 1529 (res.): Thomas Wynter (also Dean of Wells {until 1529}, Archdeacon of York, Archdeacon of Suffolk {1526–1529} and Archdeacon of Norfolk {from 1529})
7 December 1529 – 1541 (res.): William Knight

Early modern
On 14 August 1541, the Diocese of Chester was created from the Richmond and Chester archdeaconries.
1541–bef. 1554: John Bird, Bishop of Chester
bef. 1554–bef. 1559 (dep.): John Horleston (deposed)
bef. 1559–Oct 1559 (deprived): John Hansom (deprived)
Oct 1559–bef. 1574: John Horleston (again)
17 March 1574–bef. 1603 (d.): Christopher Goodman
6 November 1603 – 1607 (res.): Thomas Mallory (became Dean of Chester)
21 December 1607 – 10 March 1648 (d.): Thomas Dod
20 May 1648–bef. 1664 (res.): Henry Bridgeman (also Dean from 1660)
10 June 1664 – 26 November 1678 (d.): Charles Bridgeman
3 December 1678 – 11 March 1695 (d.): Henry Dove
2 April 1695–bef. 1703 (d.): Thomas Lamplugh
10 September 1703 – 7 May 1729 (d.): William Stratford
4 June 172922 October 1781 (d.): Samuel Peploe
30 October 178115 April 1792 (d.): Thomas Townson
9 May 179211 March 1797 (res.): Thomas Breithweite (became Archdeacon of Chester)
25 April 1797bef. 1801 (d.): George Bower
14 January 18014 June 1824 (d.): John Owen
5 October 1824bef. 1826 (res.): Henry Law (became Archdeacon of Wells)
30 December 18264 May 1854 (d.): John Headlam
On 5 October 1836, the Diocese of Ripon was erected from the Richmond archdeaconry and part of the York diocese (which became the Archdeaconry of Craven.)
7 June 185421 June 1868 (d.): Charles Dodgson (father of Lewis Carroll)

Late modern
18681894 (ret.): Edwards Cust
18941907 (res.): William Danks (became a canon of Canterbury Cathedral)
bef. 1909?: Armstrong Hall (died 12 May 1921)
19211937 (ret.): Arthur Watson (afterwards archdeacon emeritus)
193722 September 1939 (d.): Claude Thornton
19401951 (ret.): Donald Bartlett
19511954 (res.): William MacPherson (became Dean of Lichfield)
19541961 (res.): Harry Graham
19721976 (ret.): John Turnbull (afterwards archdeacon emeritus)
19761983 (res.): Paul Burbridge (became Dean of Norwich)
19831993 (ret.): Norman McDermid (afterwards archdeacon emeritus)
19932006 (ret.): Ken Good (afterwards archdeacon emeritus)
19 May 20072 March 2013 (res.): Janet Henderson
1 February 20132 February 2014: Nicholas Henshall (acting Archdeacon; became Dean of Chelmsford)
2 February 201420 April 2014: Paul Slater, Archdeacon of Craven (acting Archdeacon)

Archdeacons of Richmond and Craven
20 April 201419 July 2015: Paul Slater, Archdeacon of Richmond and Craven
19 July 201517 January 2016 (Acting): Simon Cowling, Acting Archdeacon of Richmond and Craven
17 January 201618 October 2018 (res.): Bev Mason, Archdeacon of Richmond and Craven
10 March 2019present: Jonathan Gough

Notes

References

Sources